The 2006 African U-20 Women's World Cup Qualifying Tournament was the third edition of the African under-20 women's football World Cup qualification, and the first edition of this tournament new format which served as qualification to the 2006 FIFA U-20 Women's World Championship. It was also the first time that Africa had two teams in the event. The two qualifiers were DR Congo and Nigeria.

First round

|}

Mozambique won 5−2 on aggregate and advanced to the second round.

DR Congo won 3−1 on aggregate and advanced to the second round.

Liberia won on walkover after Guinea did not appear for the first leg.

Kenya won on walkover after Congo did not appear for the first leg.

Egypt won on walkover after Ethiopia did not appear for the first leg.

Senegal won on walkover after Madagascar did not appear for the first leg.

Second round

|}

South Africa won 9−0 on aggregate and advanced to the third round.

Nigeria won 10−1 on aggregate and advanced to the third round.

Liberia won after Algeria did not appear for the second leg.

DR Congo won after Mali did not appear for the second leg.

Egypt won on walkover after Zimbabwe did not appear for the first leg.

Cameroon won on walkover after Senegal did not appear for the first leg.

Equatorial Guinea won on walkover after Morocco did not appear for the first leg.

Ghana won on walkover after Eritrea did not appear for the first leg.

Third round

|}

Nigeria won 10−2 on aggregate and advanced to the fourth round.

DR Congo won on away goals after 2−2 on aggregate and advanced to the fourth round.

Equatorial Guinea won on walkover after Egypt failed to appear for the first leg.

Cameroon and Ghana were both ejected from the competition after the first leg.

Fourth round
First legs were scheduled to be played on 27–28 May 2006, and the second legs on 10–11 June 2006.

|}

DR Congo won on walkover after Equatorial Guinea did not appear for the first leg, and qualified.

Nigeria were drawn to play the winner of Cameroon and Ghana, but both teams were ejected from the competition; therefore, Nigeria received a bye and qualified.

Qualified teams for FIFA U-20 Women's World Championship
The following two teams from CAF qualified for the FIFA U-20 Women's World Championship.

Notes and references

Notes

References

External links
African U-20 Women's World Cup Qualifying Tournament 2006 – rsssf.com

African U-20 Women's World Cup qualification
African U-20 Cup of Nations for Women
African U-20 Cup of Nations for Women
2006 in youth association football